Friedberg is a town in district Hartberg-Fürstenfeld located in Styria, Austria with 2,562 inhabitants.

Economy and Infrastructure
The train station of Friedberg offers destinations to Wiener Neustadt , Vienna , Hartberg and Fehring. In Friedberg 3 trainlines cross: The Thermenbahn , the Wechselbahn and the Pinkatalbahn.

References

Cities and towns in Hartberg-Fürstenfeld District